Ermengarde  (also Hermengarde, Ermengarda, Irmengarde, Irainsanda, Eimildis) (– after 20 September 1057) was a medieval noblewoman. Through her first marriage, to Rotbold II, Count of Provence, she was countess of Provence, and from 1011 to 1032 Ermengarde was the last queen of independent Burgundy by virtue of her second marriage to Rudolf III of Burgundy.

Life
Ermengarde's origins are obscure, and the identity of her relatives is unknown. Several scholars have, however, suggested that Ermengarde was related to Humbert I of Savoy. In the nineteenth century, several scholars hypothesised that Ermengarde's first husband was Manasses, count of Savoy, with whom she had a son, Humbert of Savoy. Laurent Ripart, by contrast, suggests that Ermengarde may have been the sister of Humbert of Savoy, who was part of the entourage of Rudolf III of Burgundy. Alternatively, François Demotz argues that Ermengarde was a member of the Sigiboldides (or Siboldi) dynasty, who were also part of Rudolf III's entourage.

Countess of Provence
Ermengarde married Rotbald II of Provence before 1002, when they made a donation to Montmajour Abbey. The couple is mentioned in the Carta liberalis in 1005. Also in 1005, they were present for the election of the new abbot at the Abbey of St Victor, Marseille, alongside Adelaide-Blanche of Anjou and her sons William III Taillefer, Count of Toulouse, and William II, Count of Provence.

With Rotbald, Ermengarde had two sons and a daughter:
 Hugh, bishop of Lausanne (r. 1018–1037).
 William III of Provence 
 Emma, who married William III Taillefer, Count of Toulouse, and thus brought the margravial title in Provence to the House of Rouergue.

Queen of Burgundy
After Rotbald's death (d. before 1011), Ermengarde married again. Her second husband, whom she married in 1011, was Rudolf III of Burgundy. Ermengarde and Rudolf were married until his death in 1032, but they had no children together.
On 24 April 1011 Rudolf issued two diplomas granting Ermengarde extensive property, including the town of Vienne, the royal castle of Pipet, the counties of Vienne and Sermorens, and all his possessions between Vienne and Lake Constance, as her dower.
In August 1011, Ermengarde intervened in Rudolf's diploma, granting Henry, bishop of Lausanne, rights over the county of Vaud.
The couple issued one diploma together, a donation to the monastery of Cluny in 1019. and Ermengarde intervened in many of Rudolf's other acts, including donations to the monastery of Saint-Martin de Savigny, and the Abbey of St. Maurice, Agaunum.

Acting independently, Ermengarde made a donation to Cluny for the sake of Rudolf's soul, and endowed the monastery of Saint-Martin de Savigny in 1031.

Succession of Burgundy
At Strasbourg in 1016, Rudolf III did homage to Emperor Henry II. At the same time, Ermengarde entrusted her sons Hugh and William to Henry II's care. Henry called Hugh and William his "beloved vassals (dilectus sibi militibus), and granted them the fiefs of Otto-William, Count of Burgundy, who had rebelled against Henry.
After Rudolf's death in September 1032, Ermengarde and her son Hugh arranged for the transfer of the crown of Burgundy and the Holy Lance to Emperor Conrad II. In January 1033, Ermengarde, and her advocate (and possible relative) Humbert of Savoy, and others, do homage to Conrad II at Zurich. The actions of Ermengarde and Humbert of Savoy ensured the permanent bond between Burgundy and Germany.

Notes

References
 Paul Lullin and Charles le Fort, eds., Régeste Genevois ou répertoire chronologique et analytique des documents imprimés relatifs à l'histoire de la ville et du diocèse de Genève avant l'année 1312 (Geneva, 1866).
Léon Menabrea, De la marche des études historiques en Savoie et en Piémont, depuis le xive siècle jusqu'à nos jours, et des développements dont ces études sont encore susceptibles (Puthod, 1839). 
Joseph Dessaix, La Savoie historique, pittoresque, statistique et biographique (Slatkine, 1854; rpt. 1994).
Laurent Ripart, Les fondements idéologiques du pouvoir des comtes de la maison de Savoie (de la fin du Xe siècle au début du XIIIe siècle (unpublished PhD thesis, Université de Nice, 1999). 
Laurent Ripart, 'Le diocèse de Belley comme foyer de la principauté savoyarde,' Le Bugey, 102 (2015),  51-64. 
Francois Demotz, 'Aux origines des Humbertiens: les Rodolphiens et le royaume de Bourgogne,' in Aux origines des Humbertiens: les Rodolphiens et le royaume de Bourgogne (Ripaille, 2003), pp. 26–43. 
Francois Demotz, L'An 888. Le Royaume de Bourgogne. Une puissance européenne au bord du Léman (Lausanne, 2012).
 Eliana Magnani, 'Monastères et aristocratie en Provence - milieu Xe - début XIIe siècle,' Vita Regularis. Ordnungen und Deutungen religiosen Leben im Mittelalter
Martin de Framond, 'La succession des comtes de Toulouse autour de l'an mil (940-1030): reconsidérations,' Annales du Midi: revue archéologique, historique et philologique de la France méridionale vol. 105 no. 204 (1993).
Georges de Manteyer, Les chartes du pays d'Avignon (439-1040) (Mâcon, 1914). 
Georges de Manteyer, La Provence du premier au douzième siècle : études d'histoire et de géographie politique, Volume 1 (Picard, 1908), 
Joseph Berge, Les erreurs de l'Histoire. Origines rectifiées des Maisons Féodales (Menton, 1952). 
D. Schwennicke, Europäische Stammtafeln: Stammtafeln zur Geschichte der Europäischen Staaten, Neue Folge, vol. II (Marburg, 1984).
Christian Sorrel, Histoire de la Savoie en images (2006).
Charles William Previte-Orton, The Early History of the House of Savoy, 1000-1233 (Cambridge, 1912).

Burgundian queens consort
Countesses of Provence
11th-century women of the Holy Roman Empire
990s births
11th-century deaths
Remarried royal consorts